Buddy Saltzman (born Hilliard Saltzman; October 17, 1924 – April 30, 2012) was an American session drummer who played on many hit songs during the 1950s, 1960s, and 1970s.

He is especially remembered for his work with The Four Seasons. On "Dawn (Go Away)" (1964) Saltzman accented the recording with bombastic around-the-kit fills and ghost notes while never using a cymbal once.

He was born in Bridgeton, New Jersey.

Selected singles discography

Selected albums discography

References

1924 births
2012 deaths
20th-century American drummers
American male drummers
People from Bridgeton, New Jersey
20th-century American male musicians